"Lovelite" is a 1984 single by the artist O'Bryan. The single was his fifth entry on the R&B chart and his only number-one hit, where it placed at the top spot for one week.  "Lovelite" did not chart on the Hot 100. "Lovelite" was produced by O'Bryan and was written by O'Bryan along with Don Cornelius.

The song's original music video became one of the first R&B videos to be banned from MTV, due to extensive nudity.

Track listing
 12" single

Chart positions

References

1984 singles
1984 songs
Capitol Records singles